Thirutham is a 2007 Indian Tamil language romantic thriller film directed by Ponraman. The film stars Harikumar, Priyanka Nair and Mansi Pritam, with Nassar, Adithya, M. S. Bhaskar, Suja Varunee, Priya, Vijay Babu and Bharathi playing supporting roles. The film, produced by Sunee Hari, had musical score by Pravin Mani and was released on 14 September 2007.

Plot

The film begins with Karthik arriving in Bangalore to meet Priya, with whom he had a six-month online friendship. Karthik then takes an elderly couple from an old-age home with him to be his parents. Karthik seduces Priya and asks her parents to marry her with the help of his new parents. Her parents, who like his character, accept and they get married. However, the next morning, Priya is shocked to see her newly-wedded groom had disappeared with her jewels and money. Her uncle Saravanan, an assistant commissioner who is charged to catch Karthik, finally arrests him during his seventh wedding in Cochin. During the enquiry, Karthik falls into a coma, and Saravanan finds in his things a prescription with the hospital address. Saravanan goes to the hospital and meets Dr. Shanmugam in Ooty. Shanmugam tells him everything.

Karthik, whose real name is Velmurugan, was Shanmugam's car driver and lived with his widowed mother in Ooty. His mother wanted him to get married, but all the women refused to marry him since he had a stammering mouth and an ugly-looking face. Therefore, Velmurugan developed an inferiority complex. Vandana, an aspiring house surgeon, came to Ooty for her training course and stayed in Shanmugam's house. Moved by Velmurugan's sad life, Vandana helped him to overcome the stammering problem, and Velmurugan fell in love with her. One day, Vandana read Velmurugan's love letter and did not talk to him anymore. After her training, she left Ooty and returned home. Priya, one of the nurses working in the same hospital, promised Velmurugan that she will bring them together. However, Priya scammed him: she posed as Vandana on the phone and talked to the innocent Velmurugan, and she enjoyed life with his hard-earned savings. When he discovered the scam, he was heartbroken. Thereafter, his mother died and he decided to end his life by falling into a ravine with his boss's car. However, he was heavily wounded and was brought to the hospital, where Shanmugam treated him. Velmurugan survived the accident but began to suffer from horrible headaches. He then underwent extensive plastic surgery on his face. Six months later, Velmurugan had become a handsome man and successfully overcame his inferiority complex, but he developed a superiority complex. Afterwards, he became a psychopath and married around five women (all named Priya) and eloped on the very next day with their jewels and valuable belongings.

Back to the present, Karthik manages to escape from the hospital and decides to go to Delhi to marry another girl named Priya, but before, he bumps into the nurse Priya. When he tries to fatally torture her, he becomes emotionally disturbed and faints. Admitted to the hospital, a worried Vandana comes to see Karthik, who is suffering from heavy headaches. Karthik begs her to kill him to relieve him from pain and suffering. Feeling guilty for what happened to him, Vandana euthanizes him and is arrested by the police.

Cast

Harikumar as Velmurugan / Karthik
Priyanka Nair as Vandana
Mansi Pritam as Priya
Nassar as Dr. Shanmugam
Adithya as Saravanan
M. S. Bhaskar as Punniyakodi
Priya as Velmurugan's mother
Vijay Babu as Priya's father
Bharathi as Priya's mother
Suja Varunee as Priya
Singamuthu as Astrologer
Nellai Siva as Head constable
S. V. S. Kumar as Doctor
Dishyum Soman
Archana Harish as Priya
Simran Khan in a special appearance

Production
Ponraman made his directorial debut with Thirutham under the banner of Foubro Films. Harikumar was selected to play the lead role for the second time after Thoothukudi (2006). Veyil fame Priyanka Nair and newcomer Mansi Pritam were chosen to play the heroines. Jeeva took in charge of cinematography. After Thoothukudi, both Harikumar and music director Pravin Mani came together for this album.

Soundtrack

The film score and the soundtrack were composed by Pravin Mani. The soundtrack features 5 tracks. Saraswathy Srinivas of Rediff.com rated the album 2 out of 5 stars and wrote, "Not many brownie points for Thirutham music. An average fare".

Release

The film was released on 14 September 2007 alongside five other films.

Kollywoodtoday.net praised Harikumar's acting and called the film "an average flick with good storyline". A critic lauded the lead pair's acting and criticized the film's screenplay. Another reviewer wrote, "Hari does go through most of the roles with easy assurance" and called the film "below average". He also noted that the film had similarities with Naan Avanillai (2007), Manmadhan (2004) and Kalyanaraman (1979).

References

2007 films
2000s Tamil-language films
Indian romantic thriller films
2000s romantic thriller films